Origny-en-Thiérache (literally Origny in Thiérache) is a commune in the Aisne department in Hauts-de-France in northern France.

Population

Personalities
Pigneau de Behaine

See also
Communes of the Aisne department

References

Thiérache
Communes of Aisne
Aisne communes articles needing translation from French Wikipedia